Cross is a 2018 medical thriller South Korean television series starring Go Kyung-pyo, Cho Jae-hyun, and Jeon So-min. It aired from January 29 to March 20, 2018, on tvN's Mondays and Tuesdays at 21:30 KST time slot.

Synopsis
A gifted young man learns medicine out of a desire to avenge his father who was brutally murdered fifteen years ago.

Cast

Main
 Go Kyung-pyo as Kang In-gyu, a genius first-year resident doctor working in the organ transplant department of Sunrim Hospital who graduated atop of his class all throughout medical school and passed his doctor's licensing exams with a perfect score.
 Cho Jae-hyun as Go Jung-hoon, a world-renowned expert in liver transplants and chief of the organ transplant center.
 Jeon So-min as Go Ji-in, an organ transplant coordinator who is the only daughter of Jung-hoon.
 Jin Yi-han as Lee Joo-hyuk, an organ transplant specialist.
 Yang Jin-sung as Son Yeon-hee, the daughter of the hospital chairman. She is a first-year fellow doctor and a maternity specialist.

Supporting

 Jang Gwang as Son Young-sik
 Kim Jong-goo as Lee Sang-hoon
 Heo Sung-tae as Kim Hyung-beom
 Yoo Seung-mok as Baek Ji-nam
Woo Ki-hoon as Lee-dong
Kim Dae-gon as Jae-hyun	
Woo Hyun as Noh Jong-il
Kim Ji-eun as Social Services staff
Seo Woo-jin as Ha Kwan-woo

Production
 The series is formerly known as Cross: God's Gift.
 Go Kyung-pyo and Yang Jin-sung previously worked together in the 2017 TV series Chicago Typewriter.
 The first script reading of the cast was held in late November 2017 at Studio Dragon in Sangam-dong.
 On February 24, 2018, actor Cho Jae-hyun was removed from the TV series following his admission of committing sexual harassment.

Original soundtrack

Part 1

Part 2

Part 3

Part 4

Part 5

Viewership

Note

References

External links
  
 Cross at Studio Dragon 
 Cross at Logos Film 
 
 

Korean-language television shows
TVN (South Korean TV channel) television dramas
2018 South Korean television series debuts
2018 South Korean television series endings
Organ transplantation in fiction
Organ trade in fiction
Prison television series
Television series about revenge
South Korean medical television series
South Korean thriller television series
Television series by Studio Dragon
Television series by Logos Film
2010s prison television series